Monterey College of Law (MCL) is a private, non-profit law school founded in 1972 in Monterey, California. The school is approved by the Committee of Bar Examiners of the State Bar of California but is not accredited by the American Bar Association.  As a result, while graduates of MCL can sit for the California Bar Exam, and upon passing, be licensed to practice law in California, they are generally not able to sit for the bar exam or practice in other states without at least passing the California bar exam first.
MCL has part-time evening J.D., Master of Legal Studies (M.L.S.), and LL.M. degree programs.

History
Monterey College of Law was founded in 1972 as a 501(c)3 nonprofit by a group of local lawyers and judges. The early years reflected a modest operation that frequently moved, using temporary rented classrooms in schools, churches, and the local Naval Postgraduate School. As founding Dean David Kirkpatrick once described, “the law school was in session when I pulled up to a rented classroom and carried the box of school supplies in from the trunk of my car.” Leon Panetta served as the new law school's first tort law professor.

In 1995, Dean Karen Kadushin negotiated a permanent home for the law school, obtaining 3.2 acres and two abandoned army buildings adjacent to California State University Monterey Bay (CSUMB) on the former Fort Ord.  By 2005, Dean Frank Hespe  had converted the first of the two buildings into a 12,000 sq. ft. renovated classroom, library, and administration building within the higher-education enclave being developed on the former Fort Ord Army base, joining CSUMB, Hartnell College, and the Monterey Peninsula College. In April 2010, the school opened its second building, a Certified LEED Platinum Community Justice Center that became home to its clinical programs and the Mandell Gisnet Center for Conflict Management.

In 2010, the law school opened a first-year satellite campus in Santa Cruz, California. After successfully completing the first-year curriculum, Santa Cruz students commuted to the main campus in Seaside, California to complete their degree programs. In May 2020, upon adding and expanding an online Hybrid JD program, the Santa Cruz satellite campus was closed because local students could take classes online and not have to commute to Seaside for their upper-division courses.

In early 2015, Monterey College of Law acquired the University of San Luis Obispo School of Law, a registered unaccredited law school formerly located in Morro Bay, California. The new law school became an approved branch of Monterey College of Law, was moved to a new campus in downtown San Luis Obispo, and was renamed the San Luis Obispo College of Law. In 2017, the law school opened its second approved branch campus, Kern County College of Law in Bakersfield, California. In July, 2022, Monterey reached an agreement, approved by the State Bar of California Committee of Bar Examiners to acquire the Empire College School of Law as a branch, pursuant to which Empire would transition from a for-profit, unaccredited law school, to a non-profit, accredited branch of Monterey, while retaining the Empire name.

Curriculum and technology 
MCL has part-time evening J.D., Master of Legal Studies (M.L.S.), and LL.M. degree programs. MCL was the first California-accredited law school authorized to offer a Master of Legal Studies degree, concurrent MLS/JD degrees, and an LL.M. advanced law degree. In 2010, MCL became the first U.S. law school to provide iPads for every student and professor. In 2017, the law school was one of the first two California accredited law schools and one of only a few law schools in the nation to be approved to offer an accredited online hybrid JD program.

Programs and clinics

Mandell Gisnet Center for Conflict Management 
Bill Daniels, one of the founding “fathers” of the law school, facilitated the creation of the Mandell Gisnet Center for Conflict Management through a local bequest. Organized in 2004 by the founding executive director and current California State Senator Bill Monning, the Center has subsequently provided mediation certification and training for almost 1,000 law students, local lawyers, and community mediators. The Center coordinates the local court-directed mediation program, the Neighbor Project, and numerous other mediation programs for city, county, and community groups.

Community clinics 
Started in 1992 by former Dean Marian Penn, the original Small Claims Advisory Clinic program has grown into more than a dozen different advisory clinics in which supervised law students provide free legal advisory services in the areas of small claims, conservatorship, guardianship, domestic violence, immigration, landlord/tenant, mediation, family law, neighbor disputes, elder law, collections, workers' compensation, social security, and probate law.

Moot court 
Since 1984, all students have participated in a Constitutional moot court program as part of the trial advocacy skills training during their final law school year.

Leadership 
Following the example of founding Dean David Kirkpatrick,  local lawyers, including Marian Penn, Joel Franklin, Rodney Jones, Al O’Connor, R. Lynn Davis, and Fred Herro served as part-time deans for the first twenty years. In 1995, Dean Karen Kadushin ushered in the era of full-time deans. Mitchel L. Winick, the current President and Dean of the law school, joined the school as Dean in August 2005.

Bar exam passage
Fewer than eleven MCL alumni sat for the October 2020 California bar exam for the first time, so a school pass rate was not reported. Of the 29 MCL alumni who repeated the exam at that sitting, six, or 21%, passed.

California Accredited Law Schools (CALS) must “maintain a minimum, [five-year] cumulative bar examination pass rate” of 40 percent or more, as calculated under Rule 4.160(N) and Guideline 12.1 of the Guidelines for Accredited Law School Rules. Monterey College of Law has had a Cumulative Pass Rate on the California Bar Exam of 47.9% in 2018, 54.3% in 2019, and 53.7% in 2020.

The law school has been an outspoken advocate requesting that the California Supreme Court adjust the scoring of the California Bar Exam from an arbitrarily high minimum passing score (“cut score”) to a score closer to the national norm. The California Supreme Court issued an order on August 10, 2020 adjusting the California “cut score” from 1440 to 1390, closer to the national mean of 1350.

References

External links
 

Law schools in California
Educational institutions established in 1972
Monterey, California
Universities and colleges in Monterey County, California
Private universities and colleges in California
1972 establishments in California